Honeaite is a rare gold thallium telluride mineral with the formula Au3TlTe2. It was discovered in the Karonie mine, Cowarna Downs Station, Western Australia, although this is not the only locality for the mineral.

Relation to other minerals
Honeaite is structurally and chemically unique.

References

Telluride minerals
Gold minerals
Gold(I) compounds
Thallium minerals
Minerals described in 2016